The Montenegro national handball team represents Montenegro in international handball competitions. The national team was formed in 2006 shortly after Montenegro became independent.

Montenegro played their first official match on 3 January 2007 in Vantaa and beat Finland (28:26). Since then, Montenegro have qualified for eight big competitions – twice for the World Cup (2013 and 2023) and for the European Championship in 2008, 2014, 2016, 2018, 2020 and 2022.

History and records

The national side first appeared in the Euro 2008 Qualifiers, which started in January 2007. After the great success in the qualifying matches, Montenegro participated at the European Championship 2008, where they finished in the second group phase. 
A year later, Montenegro failed to qualify for the World Championship 2009 and after that, there was a crisis in the results of national team.
From 2012, results improved. After a surprise win against Sweden in the qualifiers, Montenegro qualified for the World Championship 2013.
In June 2013, Montenegro eliminated Germany in the final round of qualifiers for the European Championship 2014. At the Championship, Montenegro was eliminated in the first phase.
Two years later, the Montenegrin team appeared at the European Championship 2016, but was eliminated after the first phase of the competition, without any win in three matches. Same result, Montenegro made on European Championship 2018. Finally, on European Championship 2020, Montenegro made historical victory against Serbia (22-21), but failed to qualify to the second round of tournament.

National team matches

Updated: January 23, 2023

Records

Largest  victory 41:27,  – , 6 January 2007, Budva

Largest  defeat 39:23,  – , 24 January 2011, Stavanger

Highest home attendance approx. 6,000,  –  33:25, 17 April 2022, Podgorica

Highest away attendance 11,835,  –  37:26, 13 April 2019, Copenhagen

Competitive record

World Championship
The national team of Montenegro made their first appearance at the World Cup in 2013, from their 3rd qualifying attempt. Their first World Cup match was played on 12 January 2013 against Argentina in Granollers, Spain.

European Championship
Debut on the European Championship, Montenegrin national team made after first attempt.
They participated at the Euro 2008 and made successful appearance in their first match against Russia (25:25). They qualified for the Main Phase of the European Championship.
Their second appearance was in 2014, after Montenegro sensational eliminated Germany during the qualifiers. At the tournament, Montenegro lost all three games, with elimination after the first phase.
Montenegro hoped for a better result in 2016, but it was pretty much deja vu from two years ago as they once again lost all three games and finished in last place in their group, as well as last place in the tournament claiming 16th place out of 16 teams.

Team

Current squad
Squad for the 2023 World Men's Handball Championship.

Head coach: Zoran Roganović

Uniforms
1st: red/red

2nd: green/green

3rd: black/black

GK: yellow/green/blue

Coaching staff

Head coaches
Since independence, Montenegro was led by eight different coaches. Most matches as a Montenegro coach has Zoran Roganović (34).

* Data is only for official matches (qualifiers, European Championship, World Championship).

Notable former players

See also
List of official matches of the Montenegro handball team
Handball Federation of Montenegro
Montenegro women's national handball team

References

External links

IHF profile

Men's national handball teams
Handball in Montenegro
H